Arnold Lucien Montandon (1852–1922) was a French entomologist who worked in the Grigore Antipa National Museum of Natural History in Bucharest, Romania. He described over 500 new species or subspecies in more than 100 scientific publications.

References

1852 births
1922 deaths
French expatriates in Romania